David Arnott is an American actor, screenwriter and composer.

David Arnott may also refer to:

David Arnott (American actor, born 1976), Played the role of Chris Cross in the 1992 film, CrissCross
David Arnott (minister) (born 1945), Moderator of the General Assembly of the Church of Scotland
David Arnott (marine engineer), winner of the David W. Taylor Medal
David Arnott (politician) (1899–1960), Australian politician
David Whitehorn Arnott (1915–2004), British scholar of African languages

See also
Arnott (disambiguation)
David Arnot (disambiguation)